Oyewole is a surname. Notable people with the surname include:

 Abiodun Oyewole (born 1948), American musician
 Adessoye Oyewole (born 1982), Russian footballer
 Olusola Bandele Oyewole (born 1955), Nigerian professor
 Saundra Herndon Oyewole (born 1943), American microbiologist
 Ayodeji John Oyewole (born 2004), Nigerian Petroleum Engineer